Silakhor-e Sharqi Rural District is a rural district (dehestan) in the Central District of Azna County, Lorestan Province, Iran. At the 2006 census, its population was 8,171, in 1,763 families.  The rural district has 13 villages.

References 

Rural Districts of Lorestan Province
Azna County